František Čermák and Michal Mertiňák were the defending champions but Mertiňák decided not to participate.

Čermák played alongside Filip Polášek and they reached the final, where Eric Butorac and Jean-Julien Rojer defeated them to win the title.

Seeds

Draw

Draw

References
 Main Draw

Proton Malaysian Open - Doubles
2011 Doubles